The A4086 is an A road in Gwynedd. The road goes between Caernarfon and the A5 near Capel Curig.

In Caernarfon,  the road leads towards the east to cross Afon Seiont near Pont-rug, then turns towards the south-east, past the shore of Llyn Padarn and Llyn Peris and through Llanberis Pass, with the cliffs of Glyder Fawr on the left and Crib Goch on the right, and arrives at Pen-y-pass, the most popular place to climb Snowdon.

The road then turns towards the north-east near Pen-y-Gwryd, to the junction with the  A498, along Dyffryn Mymbyr and past Llynnau Mymbyr before joining the A5 near Capel Curig.

Towns and villages on the A4086 
 Caernarfon
 Pont-Rug
 Llanrug
 Cwm-y-glo
 Llanberis
 Nant Peris
 Capel Curig

References

Transport in Conwy County Borough
Transport in Gwynedd
Roads in Wales